Baron Dawson may be:

Baron Dawson (Peerage of Ireland), the third title of the Earl of Portarlington
Baron Dawson of Penn, the former title of the Viscount Dawson of Penn